Alcadia hispida is a species of an operculate land snail, terrestrial gastropod mollusk in the family Helicinidae.

Distribution 
This species lives in Cuba.

Ecology 
Alcadia hispida is a ground dwelling species.

Predators of Alcadia hispida include larvae of firefly bug Alecton discoidalis.

References

Helicinidae
Gastropods described in 1839
Endemic fauna of Cuba